Hamdan is a name of Arab origin of aristocratic descent and many political ties within the middle east and the Arab World, controlling import/export mandates over port authorities.
Among people named Hamdan include:

Given name

 Hamdan bin Mohammed Al Maktoum, hereditary Prince of Dubai
 Hamdan Mohamad, Malaysian businessman 
 Hamdan Odha Al-Bishi, Saudi Arabian sprinter

Middle name
 Anwar Hamdan Muhammed Al-Noor, former Guantanamo detainee

Surname
 Abdullah bin Suleiman Al Hamdan (1887–1965), Saudi Arabian politician and businessman
 Gamal Hamdan (1928-1993), Egyptian geographer, author, university professor
 Ghassan Hamdan, Iraqi scholar, poet and translator
 Gibran Hamdan (born 1981), American NFL and NFL Europe quarterback
 Hasan Hamdan, Lebanese actor and voice actor
 Jamal al-Din Hamdan, 19th century Lebanese Druze Sheikh
 Jamal Hamdan (actor) (born 1958), Lebanese actor and voice actor
 Mais Hamdan (born 1982), Jordanian actress, singer and television presenter
 Mustafa Hamdan, Lebanese general, head of the Presidential Guard
 Saad Hamdan, Lebanese actor and voice actor
 Salim Ahmed Hamdan, Yemeni Guantanamo detainee, driver and bodyguard of Osama bin Laden
 Yasmine Hamdan (born 1976), Lebanese singer, songwriter and actress
 Zeid Hamdan, Lebanese music producer

Sheikh Hamdan
It may refer to:
 Sheikh Hamdan bin Rashid Al Maktoum, Deputy Ruler of Dubai
 Sheikh Hamdan bin Mohammed Al Maktoum, Sheikh Hamdan's nephew, Crown Prince of Dubai
 Sheikh Hamdan bin Zayed bin Sultan Al Nahyan (born 1963) son of Zayed II of Abu Dhabi, United Arab Emirati politician
 Sheikh Hamdan bin Mohammed Al Nahyan (1930-1989?) United Arab Emirati politician

Other
 Al-Hamdan, famous Druze family
 Banu Hamdan, ancient Yemeni tribal confederation
 Hamdan v. Rumsfeld, US Supreme Court case involving Salim Ahmed Hamdan
 Hamdan Air Base in Syria - see Deir ez-Zor Airport

Arabic-language surnames
Arabic masculine given names